Emily Arthur  (born 24 April 1999) is an Australian snowboarder who competes internationally.
 
She represented Australia at the 2018 Winter Olympics, placing 11th.

References

External links

1999 births
Living people
Australian female snowboarders 
Sportspeople from Sydney
Olympic snowboarders of Australia 
Snowboarders at the 2018 Winter Olympics 
Snowboarders at the 2022 Winter Olympics
Snowboarders at the 2016 Winter Youth Olympics
21st-century Australian women